The 1901 Chicago Eclectic Medical football team, was an American football team that represented the Chicago Eclectic Medical College, known a year later as American Medical College of Chicago in the 1901 college football season. In their first year of play, the medics compiled a 0–3 record and surrendered 78 points while not scoring a single point themselves.

Schedule

Roster

This roster was compiled from accounts of the Notre Dame and St. Charles Athletic Club football games.

McMahon, right end
Koehler, right end
Hart, right tackle
Keeber, right guard
Clingsmith, right guard
Gallear, center
Sheets, left guard
Hayward, left tackle
Linberg, left end and left tackle
Cone, left end
Cooper, right halfback
Smith, left halfback
Neville, quarterback
Quille, quarterback
Bunch, fullback

References

Chicago Eclectic Medical
American Medical football seasons
College football winless seasons
Chicago Eclectic Medical football